Arrad Foot is a hamlet in South Lakeland, Cumbria, England.

The hamlet is situated on a minor road just off the A590 road, with the village of Greenodd to the north, and the town Ulverston to the south.

Hamlets in Cumbria
South Lakeland District